The South East Australian Basketball League (SEABL) was an Australian semi-professional basketball league. The league comprised both a men's and women's competition and was run by the country's governing body, Basketball Australia. The league was one and the same with the Australian Basketball Association (ABA) from its inception in 1981 until 1993. With the inclusion of a North conference from Queensland in 1994, the history of the SEABL and ABA was split from one another for the first time. Over the years, the SEABL boasted teams from Victoria, New South Wales, Queensland, Tasmania, South Australia and the Australian Capital Territory. The league was disbanded following the 2018 season and was replaced by NBL1.

History
The SEABL was first introduced as the South Eastern Basketball League (SEBL) in 1981, with the long-standing South and East conferences later established in 1986. In 1988, the SEBL was renamed the South East Australian Basketball League, and in 1990, a women's competition was introduced. In 1992, the SEABL was renamed the Continental Basketball Association (CBA). The early history of the SEABL and what became known as the Australian Basketball Association (ABA) was one in the same between 1981 and 1993, prior to the CBA's introduction of a North conference from Queensland in 1994. By 2001, the ABA had six conferences, and in 2002, the South and East conferences became known as the South East Australian Basketball League again. Season 2008 marked the final year of the long-standing ABA National Finals series, with the ABA ceasing operations in 2009 and leaving the SEABL as an independent league. In 2012, the women's competition was divided into two conferences for the first time.

After 32 seasons (1986–2017) of South and East conferences, the SEABL merged the two conferences in both the men's and women's competitions in 2018. Following the 2018 season, the SEABL was disbanded in favour of a new Victorian-based competition known as NBL1.

League championships

Men

Women

References

External links

 Archived seabl.com.au website
 Old website
 SEABL All-Time Award Winners (as of 2007)
 Past MVP award winners
 BA death knell for SEABL

 
Basketball in South Australia
Basketball in Tasmania
Basketball in Victoria (Australia)
Defunct basketball leagues
Basketball leagues in Australia
1981 establishments in Australia
Sports leagues established in 1981
2018 disestablishments in Australia
Sports leagues disestablished in 2018
NBL1